Route 315 is a state highway in northern Connecticut running entirely within Simsbury.

Route description
Route 315 begins at an intersection with US 202 and Route 10 in Simsbury. It heads southeast across the Farmington River, then turns north along the river and east to the Tariffville section of Simsbury, where it ends at an intersection with Route 189.

History
Route 315 was commissioned from former SR 915 in 1963. The only major changes since are the replacement of two bridges in 1992 and 1998.

Junction list

References

External links

315
Transportation in Hartford County, Connecticut